{{Infobox writer  
| name         = E. A. Richardson
| image        =
| imagesize    = 150px
| alt          =
| caption      = 
| pseudonym    = "Big Rich"
| birth_name    = Emory Aaron Richardson
| birth_date    = 
| birth_place   = Clay Township, Pike County, Indiana
| death_date    =  
| death_place   = 
| occupation   = Poet, songwriter 
| nationality  = 
| ethnicity    = 
| citizenship  = 
| education    = 
| alma_mater   = 
| period       = 
| genre        = 
| subject      = 
| movement     = 
| notableworks =
| spouse       = 
| partner      = 
| children     = 
| relatives    = 
| influences   = 
| influenced   = 
| awards       = 
| signature    = Big Rich signature.jpg
| website      = 
| portaldisp   = 
}}Emory Aaron "Big Rich" Richardson' (April 30, 1886 – September 17, 1965) was an American poet. He was the first person to be unofficially designated state poet laureate of Indiana. The Indiana State Poet Laureate position was not made official until July 1, 2005. Much of his poetry was written about his native Indiana, especially Hoosier nature and country life.

 Life 
Emory Aaron Richardson was born on a farm in Clay Township, Pike County, Indiana. He began writing poetry in 1910. The first poem to establish him as a poet was his famous My Alligator Grin.

Richardson addressed the Indiana General Assembly on February 12, 1929, Abraham Lincoln's Birthday, where he read his poem Lincoln, the Hoosier and was voted state poet laureate by the legislature. Richardson's state poet laureate honor was reaffirmed in 1965 after his death.

When Richardson would be asked for his autograph he would often sign it with the addition of a couplet of his favorite original motto: "Let's trade grins, Then be frien's."

During his life he published eight books of poems, most popular being Indiana and Other Poems, Hoosier Holly-Hocks, and Turkey Run and Selected Poems''.

Selected works

Poems 

 A-Beggin' Ma
 A Choice River
 A Deaf and Dumb Dance
 A Good Turn vs. A Fast One
 A Sad Circumstance
 Alpine Flowers
 Another Notch
 Boost Our Town
 The Boy Scouts
 The Builders
 Byers
 The Cardinal
 Cured O' Braggin'
 Dying At Home
 Eva
 The Exit of the Gourd
 Friendship
 Four-Line Philosophy
 Honored
 Indiana
 Indiana Authors
 Indiana's President
 In My Library
 Lincoln, the Hoosier
 Lincoln's Mother
 Luck Alone Won't Win
 Mutual Laughter
 My Alligator Grin
 The Oak
 Ol' Leiter's Ford
 Old New Harmony
 One Year
 Pawpaws
 Persimmons
 Petunias
 The Poets
 The Question
 The Remedy
 Retrospection
 Rev'rence for Law
 Roadside Beauties
 Sassafras Fence Posts
 Sassafras Tea
 The "School Marm"
 Shifts
 Thanksgiving Dinner
 Toddy Waddy
 Too Tickled
 The Torch Bearers
 Turkey Run
 Union
 The Wabash Bottoms
 We Clowns
 Well Done

Poetry collections 
Indiana and Other Poems
Hoosier Holly-Hocks
Turkey Run and Selected Poems

Songs 
We'll Have Fun

See also 
Indiana State Poet Laureate

Notes 

1886 births
1965 deaths
20th-century American poets
Poets Laureate of Indiana